Siniša Žugić (born December 17, 1969) is a Serbian diver. He competed at the 1996 Summer Olympics in Atlanta and took 38th place in Men's Springboard.

He currently works as a coach in Vračar Diving Club.

References

External links
Siniša Žugić - Sports-Reference.com

1969 births
Living people
Serbian male divers
Olympic divers of Yugoslavia
Divers at the 1996 Summer Olympics